Simeon Sage House is a historic home located at Scottsville in Monroe County, New York. It was built about 1830 and consists of a 1-story, five-by-two-bay, rectangular main block with a smaller 1-story rectangular rear wing in a vernacular Federal style.  There are later Greek Revival style modification. It is an example of a working man's cottage.  It serves as home to the Wheatland Historical Association and a rectangular, frame educational facility and meeting room were added in 2000.

It was listed on the National Register of Historic Places in 2010.

References

Houses on the National Register of Historic Places in New York (state)
Houses completed in 1830
Houses in Monroe County, New York
1830 establishments in New York (state)
National Register of Historic Places in Monroe County, New York